Miodrag Arturo Marinovic Solo de Zaldívar (born 7 January 1967) is a Chilean politician who served as a member of the Chamber of Deputies, representing the former District 60 of the Magallanes Region from 2010 to 2014.

References

1967 births
Living people
Members of the Chamber of Deputies of Chile
People from Punta Arenas
Chilean people of Croatian descent
21st-century Chilean politicians
Federico Santa María Technical University alumni